Zincobotryogen is a hydrous sulfate mineral with the chemical formula . It forms bright orange red monoclinic prismatic crystals that exhibit a vitreous to greasy luster. Its specific gravity is  2.201 and it has a Mohs hardness of 2.5.

It is a rare secondary mineral which forms in arid climates by alteration of other zinc minerals. It was named for its zinc content and it relationship to botryogen. It has been reported from the Xitieshan Mine, Qinghai, Northwest Region, China; Rammelsberg mine, near Goslar, Harz Mountains, Germany; the Bisbee district of Arizona and various mines in Colorado.

References

Zinc minerals
Magnesium minerals
Manganese(II) minerals
Iron(III) minerals
Sulfate minerals
Monoclinic minerals
Minerals in space group 14